Divya Premaya also known as Divyamaya Premaya is a 1948 Sri Lankan Sinhala language drama film which was directed by D.S. Babu and N.V. Javeri. Luman Rajapakse and Srimathi Karunadevi acted in the lead roles for the first time through this film. This film was only the 4th Sinhala movie in the Cinema of Sri Lanka and the first movie with scenes in Sri Lanka This was only one of 3 Sinhala language films to have released in 1948. The film was released on 22 May 1948 through the Ginthupitiya Talkies, the year Sri Lanka got independence from the British Empire.

Cast 
 Luman Rajapakse
 Srimathi Karunadev
 Robert Perera 
 Simon Silva  
 Peter Siriwardene

References

External links

Films set in Sri Lanka (1948–present)
Sri Lankan black-and-white films
Sri Lankan drama films
1948 drama films
1948 films
Films scored by C. N. Pandurangan